Peter Donald Caswell (born 16 January 1957 in Leatherhead) is an English former professional footballer who played in the Football League as a goalkeeper.

References

1957 births
Living people
People from Leatherhead
English footballers
Association football goalkeepers
Crystal Palace F.C. players
Crewe Alexandra F.C. players
Telford United F.C. players
English Football League players
National League (English football) players